Collected is a triple-CD greatest hits album by Greek singer Demis Roussos, released in 2015 by Universal Music Group.

Commercial performance
In Belgium the album reached no. 1 in Flanders (43 weeks on the chart) and no 3. in Wallonia (58 weeks on the chart).

Track listing

Charts

Weekly charts

Year-end charts

See also
 List of number-one albums of 2015 (Belgium)

References

External links
 Demis Roussos – Collected at Discogs

2015 compilation albums
Demis Roussos albums
Philips Records albums